The 2020 Tennessee Republican presidential primary took place on March 3, 2020, as one of fourteen contests scheduled for Super Tuesday in the Republican Party presidential primaries for the 2020 presidential election.

Results
Incumbent United States President Donald Trump was challenged by two candidates: former congressman Joe Walsh of Illinois, and former governor Bill Weld of Massachusetts. Walsh withdrew from the race prior to the primary. There was also an uncommitted option on the ballot. Trump won the state in a landslide victory over Walsh and Weld.

Results by county

References

Tennessee Republican
Republican primary
Tennessee Republican primaries